Christopher M. "Chris" Bell (born August 13, 1970) is an American politician serving as a member of the Mississippi House of Representatives from the 65th district. Elected in November 2015, he assumed office on January 5, 2016.

Early life and education 
Bell was born in Chicago, Illinois, on August 13, 1970. He earned a Bachelor of Science degree in criminal justice from Jackson State University.

Career 
Outside of politics, Bell works in the insurance industry. He was elected to the Mississippi House of Representatives in November 2015 and assumed office on January 5, 2016. Bell also serves as vice chair of the House Executive Contingent Fund Committee.

References 

Living people
1970 births
Politicians from Chicago
Jackson State University alumni
Democratic Party members of the Mississippi House of Representatives
African-American state legislators in Mississippi
21st-century African-American people